Saint Nicolas' Roman Catholic Church in Mir, Belarus, is a Renaissance church commissioned by Mikołaj Krzysztof "the Orphan" Radziwiłł. It was probably designed by Giovanni Maria Bernardoni and erected without his personal participation in 1599–1605. The church tower was partly destroyed during the Soviet period, and recently restored.

Sources
 Т. Габрусь, Саборы помняць усё, Мінск, 2007, с. 104–107. (in Belarusian)

Roman Catholic churches in Belarus
Renaissance architecture in Belarus
Radziwiłł family
Mir, Belarus
Roman Catholic churches completed in 1605
17th-century Roman Catholic church buildings